Stumpwork is the second studio album by English post-punk band Dry Cleaning. It was released on 21 October 2022, on 4AD Records.

Background
In June 2022, the band announced a new single, "Don't Press Me", which premiered on BBC Radio 6 Music on 14 June. That same day they announced that their second album Stumpwork would be released on 21 October 2022. As with their debut, the album was recorded at Rockfield Studios in Wales, and produced by John Parish.

Critical reception

Track listing

Personnel
Dry Cleaning
 Florence Shaw – vocals, percussion, engineering
 Lewis Maynard – bass, bird calls, double bass, organ, percussion
 Tom Dowse – guitar, kazoo, keyboards, lap steel guitar, loops, percussion, whistle
 Nick Buxton – clarinet, drums, drum programming, horn arrangements, keyboards, percussion, synthesizer, tenor saxophone, vibraphone

Additional personnel
 John Parish – production, mixing, engineering, percussion, piano, trombone, vibraphone
 Jason Mitchell – mastering
 Ali Chant – mixing
 Oliver Baldwin – mix engineering, engineering
 Fabian Prynn – engineering
 Joe Jones – engineering, field recording, tape transfer
 Gavin Fitzjohn – baritone saxophone, flugelhorn, tenor saxophone, trumpet
 Rottingdean Bazaar – creative direction, artwork, design
 Annie Collinge – artwork, design, photography
 Claire Huss – graphic design

Charts

References

2022 albums
4AD albums
Dry Cleaning (band) albums
Albums produced by John Parish